Elikkattoor is a village in India near Punalur, Kerala.

Politics
Elikkattoor is part of Pathanapuram assembly constituency in mavelikkara (Lok Sabha constituency). Shri. K.B Ganeshkumar is the current MLA of pathanapuram . Shri.kodikunnil suresh is the current member of parliament of mavelikkara

References

Villages in Kollam district